The 5th Discover Screenwriting Award, given by the American Screenwriters Association on March 9, 2006, honored the best screenwriter(s) of 2005.

Winner and nominees
 Dan Futterman – Capote
 George Clooney and Grant Heslov – Good Night, and Good Luck.
 Dan Futterman – Capote
 Miranda July – Me and You and Everyone We Know
 Angus MacLachlan – Junebug
 Josh Olson – A History of Violence

American Screenwriters Association Awards
2005 film awards